West Ely is an unincorporated community in Marion County, in the U.S. state of Missouri.

History
A post office called West Ely was established in 1836, and remained in operation until 1908. Despite its name, the village lies east of Ely.

References

Unincorporated communities in Marion County, Missouri
Unincorporated communities in Missouri